Dato' Ahmad Azhar bin Othman (born 24 November 1968), better known by his stage name Awie, is a Malaysian singer, musician, and actor. Awie is considered one of the greatest Malaysian vocalist of all time.

Born in Datuk Keramat, Kuala Lumpur, Awie's music career start in 1985 with a rock band called Wings, which he became a lead vocal at age 17. Their First Studio Album Released in 1987 called Belenggu Irama that sold around 180,000 units which at the time is pretty impressive for a young newcomer and thus hit an instant fame. After Belenggu Irama, He records another four hit albums with Wings in five-year span between 1988 and 1993. Awie ventured into Acting and starred in Pemburu Bayang alongside the future Queen of Rock Ella in 1993. Awie then starred in many movies in the 1990s. While Wings is at the very peak of its career, Awie had a disagreement with then Wings manager Ali Bakar and left the group in 1993. As a solo artist, Awie became one of the best selling artist in Malaysia and became a millionaire in 1995.

Awie's career slowed down in early 2000s but he still appeared in many movies - mainly comedies. He rejoined Wings to record two more albums and became one of few artist in Malaysia to record studio albums in four different decades (80s, 90s, 00s, 10s). In 2017, he has been given Knight Companion The Esteemed Order of the Crown of Pahang that carries the title Dato' by Sultan of Pahang, Sultan Ahmad Shah. Now, he is called Dato' Ahmad Azhar Bin Othman or Dato' Awie.

Career

Early Involvement 
At the early age of 17, Awie worked at Panggung Anniversary, Kuala Lumpur. His work enabled him to accompany several popular rock bands at the time such as Search, Bloodshed, Ella & The Boys, Sweet Charity.

Wings 

Awie started his music career in Kuala Lumpur in 1985, fronting the Malaysian rock band Wings, which had an original line-up of Black (drums), Syam (guitars), Eddie (bass) and Awie (lead vocals). They debuted with the album Belenggu Irama. Their subsequent album Hukum Karma features successful singles "Misteri Mimpi Syakilla" (composed by J.S. Kevin) and "Taman Rashidah Utama" (written by a producer Bob Lokman). Various albums followed, including Teori Domino, Jerangkung Dalam Almari and Bazooka Penaka. A number of Wings's hits are composed by singer-songwriter M. Nasir.

Awie left the band in 1993 after reported disagreements with Ali Bakar (Wings manager), and pursued a career as a solo artist and actor. He re-joined Wings in 2002 after lukewarm fan response to his replacements Mus (formerly from May) and Mel (a club singer). The band is still active. Their recent concert appearances and recordings include Wings Alive 2006 and Wings Live in KL 1991. On top of that, Awie had joined the band Samudera Astana.

Solo career 
During his departure from Wings in 1993, Awie recorded his first solo album called Awie (1994) which sold around 220,000 units, a record for the highest selling album for male solo artist in Malaysia to date. Followed by couples of successful Albums such as Awie Unplugged (1995), O-Tak (1996) and Satu (1998). His compilations album Best Of Awie (1999) sold around 300,000 to 600,000 units.

Film career 
Awie began his acting career in 1992 with the film Pemburu Bayang. Other locally-successful films followed, the more prominent ones being Bara and the Sembilu series. Recently Awie has concentrated on comedic roles.

Personal life 
Awie was engaged to Miss Malaysia Erra Fazira, his co-star in Sembilu. Due to reported infidelity, the engagement was called off.

Months later, he was caught by several Islamic law enforcers in a hotel room with Arni Nazira, his co-star in Nafas Cinta. Their obligated marriage produced two daughters. In October 2006, Arni Nazira filed for divorce after 8 years of marriage. The reason for the divorce was claimed to be due to Awie's marriage to Rozana Misbun in a secret ceremony in southern Thailand.

Awie married again in 2016 to Sharifah Ladyana Syed Samsuddin at Songkhla, Thailand.

In November 2021, Awie was ordered by the Malaysian Court of Appeal to pay RM80,000 in damages for the assault and battery of ex-wife Rozana Misbun.

Filmography

Feature films

Telemovie

Television series

Television

Discography

Album studio (With Wings)

Album solo studio

References

External links 
 

1968 births
Living people
Malaysian male actors
Malaysian people of Malay descent
Malaysian male pop singers
Malaysian pop rock singers
Malaysian rock singers
Malaysian heavy metal singers
People from Kuala Lumpur
Malay-language singers
KRU Studios contract players